Rezaie (also transliterated as Rezaee, Rezai, Rezayee, or Rezayi) is an Iranian word meaning "of Reza". It may refer to:

People
Rezai family (four brothers: Ali, Mahmood, Abbas and Ghassem), a powerful family in 1970s Iran
Abbas Mohammad-Rezaei, Iranian footballer
Alireza Rezaei, Iranian wrestler
Aravane Rezaï, Iranian-French tennis player 
Fariba Rezayee, Afghan judoka
Ghasem Rezaei, Iranian wrestler
Haji Rezai, Iranian judge
Kaveh Rezaei, Iranian footballer
Mohammad Rezaei (disambiguation)
 Mohammad Rezaei (wrestler, born 1958), Iranian wrestler
 Mohammad Rezaei (wrestler, born 1978), Iranian wrestler
Mohsen Rezaee, Iranian politician
Rahman Rezaei, Iranian footballer
Shah Gul Rezai, Afghan politician
Shaima Rezayee, Afghan television presenter
Sheys Rezaei, Iranian footballer
Zabihollah Rezaee, Iranian-American accountancy professor
Zakria Rezai, Afghan footballer

Places
Rezayi, Hormozgan, Iran
Rezayi, Lorestan, Iran